Nine News Sydney is the local news bulletin for the Nine Network station in Sydney, airing across New South Wales each night.

Like all Nine News bulletins, the Sydney bulletin runs for one hour. from 6pm every day. It covers the day's latest local, national and international news, as well as sport, weather and finance.

History

The Sydney bulletin was presented by Brian Henderson from 1964 until his retirement in November 2002, with then-Sunday presenter Jim Waley taking over in early 2003.

In 2005, despite the fact that National Nine News Sydney continued to retain its long-standing ratings lead over Ten Eyewitness News Sydney and Seven News Sydney in the 2003-4 ratings seasons, Waley was replaced with then-weekend presenter Mark Ferguson. In 2004, National Nine News Sydney won 27 out of a possible 40 ratings weeks. Following this, the 6pm bulletin started to lose its long-time ratings lead to the rival Seven News Sydney.

Mike Munro was the previous weekend news presenter, until he resigned from the Nine Network in July 2008. He presented his last bulletin on Sunday 26 October 2008. He was replaced by Michael Usher.

In January 2009, Mark Ferguson was replaced as weeknight presenter by Peter Overton. Ferguson returned to his weekend news presenting position, which he previously held during Jim Waley's stint as weeknight presenter.

In July 2009, it was revealed that weekend news presenter Mark Ferguson would move to Seven News from October. Ferguson, who had been with Nine for 17 years, was removed immediately from the Sydney weekend bulletin and was replaced by Georgie Gardner. Ferguson continued to present Nine Afternoon News bulletin on until his contract expired in September 2009.

Mike Bailey presented weather forecasts on Fridays and Saturdays, until he was sacked in early 2009. Jaynie Seal, who had previously presented weather from Sunday to Thursday, returned to weekday weather presenting. In February 2010, Nine announced that Natalie Gruzlewski will be presenting the weather from Monday to Thursday and also filing lifestyle and entertainment reports for Nine News with Seal presenting weather on Friday to Sunday.

Nine News Sydney is also broadcast to southern and central New South Wales & the ACT in addition to local Nine News bulletins. It is presented from the Nine Network's TCN-9 Studio 1.

On 6 January 2014, all Nine national channels permanently extended their 6pm news service to one hour pushing A Current Affair into the 7pm timeslot.

In November 2017, it was announced that Georgie Gardner had been appointed co-host of Today replacing Lisa Wilkinson. Deborah Knight has been announced as Gardner's successor presenting Nine News Sydney on Friday and Saturday nights.

In January 2019, it was announced that Deborah Knight had been appointed co-host of Today replacing Karl Stefanovic.

In January 2020, Georgie Gardner returned to front the weekend bulletin, replacing Deborah Knight who went on to hosting the radio drive show on 2GB.

Current presenters

Fill-in presenters 
The weekend (Friday and Saturday) team are generally the predominant substitutes for the weeknight bulletin. Mark Burrows is the primary fill-in news presenter with Charles Croucher, Jayne Azzopardi and Lizzie Pearl also filling in from time to time. Danika Mason and Emma Lawrence are the main fill-in sport presenters, while Kate Creedon, Airlie Walsh or Sophie Walsh present the weather if neither Amber Sherlock or Belinda Russell are available.

Previous presenters
Note: The current roster for the presenters on Nine News Sydney is the main team present Sunday –Thursday (classified as the Weeknight team below) and the secondary team present Fridays and Saturdays (classed as Weekends below). This was not always the case.

Weeknights
Chuck Faulkner (1956–1963)
Brian Henderson (1964–2002)
Jim Waley (2003–2005)
Mark Ferguson (2006–2008)

Weekends
Brian Henderson (1957–1964)
Ian Ross through the 1970s, 1980s and 1990s.
Mark Ferguson (2003–2005, 2009)
Mike Munro (2005–2008)
Michael Usher (2008–2009)
Georgie Gardner (2009–2017)
Deborah Knight (2017–2019)

Sport
 Ken Sutcliffe (1982–2016)
 Yvonne Sampson (Friday Nights) (2016)
 Cameron Williams (2016–2022)

Weekend Sport:
 Stephanie Brantz (2008–2010)
 Andrew Voss (2010)
 Cameron Williams (2010–2015)
 Erin Molan (2016–2021)

Weather
 Alan Wilkie (1977–2001)
Georgie Gardner (2002–2004)
Jaynie Seal (2004–2006)
Majella Wiemers (2006–2007)
Jaynie Seal (2007–2010)
Natalie Gruzlewski (2010–2012)

Weekend Weather:
Jaynie Seal (2002–2004)
Majella Wiemers (2006)
Jaynie Seal (2006–2007)
Mike Bailey (2007–2009)
Jaynie Seal (2010–2011)
Amber Sherlock (2011–2012)
Sylvia Jeffreys (2012–2014)
Natalia Cooper (2014–2015)

Reporters

News

Sport 

 Zac Bailey
 Michael Chammas
 Sam Djordan
 Luke Dufficy
 Emma Lawrence
 Tom Marriott
 Danika Mason
 Danny Wielder (chief rugby league reporter)

Notable former reporters
 Charles Croucher (now 9News Political Editor, based in Canberra)
 Chris O'Keefe (now Drive Host, 2GB Radio)

Ratings

The bulletin was the most popular service in New South Wales. When long-serving anchor, Brian Henderson retired at the end of 2002, and Ian Ross moved to Seven at the end of 2003, ratings quickly declined (Nine out-rated Ten and Seven during Jim Waley's tenure in 2003–04), and Nine won 27 out of a possible 40 weeks in 2004. Nine replaced Jim Waley with a much younger presenter, Mark Ferguson, then aged just 38. Whilst ratings were starting to slightly increase, the bulletin slipped to third, behind both Seven News and ABC News. In 2008, the station did not win a single week in Sydney (five years previous it won every single week), Ferguson was moved back to the weekend position and replaced by Peter Overton. For his first month, ratings slipped to fourth, behind Ten News at Five, before quickly catching up to trail ABC News. Towards the end of 2009, Nine's ratings started to improve, with this surge in viewership coinciding with the retirement of Ian Ross as the anchor of the rival Seven News Sydney.

In August 2022, Nine News Sydney achieved the top ratings for the twelfth consecutive year.

References

Australian television news shows
Nine News
Black-and-white Australian television shows
Television shows set in New South Wales
1956 Australian television series debuts
1960s Australian television series
1970s Australian television series
1980s Australian television series
1990s Australian television series
2000s Australian television series
2010s Australian television series